The Genoa Building, at the intersection of Southeast Belmont Street and Southeast 29th Avenue in Portland in the U.S. state of Oregon, is a single-story commercial building listed on the National Register of Historic Places. Built in a Vernacular style with Mediterranean features in 1930, it was added to the register in 1997.

After construction of the Morrison Bridge over the Willamette River in the late 19th century, Belmont Street became an important arterial with a streetcar line extending from central downtown Portland to as far east as Southeast 34th Avenue. A business district that centered on the original streetcar terminus gradually spread up and down Belmont. Among the last of the buildings in this development was the Genoa Building.

Home to three separate storefronts facing Belmont Street, the Genoa is a square building  on each side. Early tenants included a pharmacist, a barber, and a grocer. Significant architectural features include display windows across the north side and part of the east side of the building,  interior ceiling heights, a partial basement in the rear, and a red clay tile roof.

J.W. Wilson was the original owner of the building, constructed by Knott and Rogers. Winifred Guild acquired the property in 1943, and the Guild family retained control of it until 1971, after which it was converted to restaurant space.

See also
 Genoa (restaurant)
 National Register of Historic Places listings in Southeast Portland, Oregon

References

National Register of Historic Places in Portland, Oregon
Commercial buildings on the National Register of Historic Places in Oregon
Commercial buildings completed in 1930
1930 establishments in Oregon
Sunnyside, Portland, Oregon
Portland Historic Landmarks